Part Eight (Part VIII) of the Constitution of Albania is the eighth of eighteen parts. Titled Constitutional Court, it consists of 11 articles. Together with Part Nine (The Courts), and Part Ten (The Office of the Prosecutor) underwent radical changes in 2016 during the so-called Justice Reform, which were the efforts of lawmakers to fight corruption, organized crime, nepotism in the justice system.

Constitutional Court

References

8